Boophis ankaratra is a species of frog in the family Mantellidae.
It is endemic to Madagascar.
Its natural habitats are subtropical or tropical moist montane forests, rivers, pastureland, rural gardens, and heavily degraded former forest.
It is threatened by habitat loss.

References

ankaratra
Endemic frogs of Madagascar
Amphibians described in 1993
Taxonomy articles created by Polbot